This is an alphabetical list of the covers performed on the Live Lounge section of the 2021- radio show Rickie, Melvin and Charlie on BBC Radio 1 (and previously on The Jo Whiley Show, Fearne Cotton's radio show and Clara Amfo's show before Whiley, Cotton and Amfo left the show), hosted by Rickie Haywood-Williams, Melvin Odoom and Charlie Hedges. There are also a few that were performed at the Live Lounge tent at festivals, such as Glastonbury Festival and Radio 1's Big Weekend. Also some of the covers are performed on the Live Lounge Tour, in which the songs are performed at a location that means something to the artist.

Songs that appear on Live Lounge compilations or other releases are footnoted.

0–9

A

B

C

D

E

F

G

H

I

J

K

L

M

N

O

P

Q

R

S

T

U

V

W

X

Y

Z

Notes

References

External links

Live Lounge
Live Lounge Covers